Acraga beebei is a moth of the family Dalceridae. It is found in northern Venezuela. The habitat consists of tropical premontane moist forests.

The length of the forewings is about 10 mm. The forewings are light yellow and the hindwings whitish. Adults are on wing in January, June, August, September and November.

Etymology
The species is named for William Beebe, who opened field stations that contributed greatly to the knowledge of Dalceridae of Guyana, Trinidad and Venezuela.

References

Dalceridae
Moths described in 1994